ISPS may refer to:
 Isoprene synthase, an enzyme
 International Ship and Port Facility Security Code
 International Sports Promotion Society